GHN is a Georgian news agency that covered the area of Georgia and Black Sea countries. Founder and General Director is Teimuraz Chumburidze. It's headquartered in Tbilisi, Georgia and publishes in Georgian, Russian and English.

References

External links
  
  
  

2005 establishments in Georgia (country)
Mass media in Tbilisi
News agencies based in Georgia (country)